Thromboxane A2 (TXA2) is a type of thromboxane that is produced by activated platelets during hemostasis and has prothrombotic properties: it stimulates activation of new platelets as well as increases platelet aggregation. This is achieved by activating the thromboxane receptor, which results in platelet-shape change, inside-out activation of integrins, and degranulation. Circulating fibrinogen binds these receptors on adjacent platelets, further strengthening the clot. Thromboxane A2 is also a known vasoconstrictor and is especially important during tissue injury and inflammation. It is also regarded as responsible for Prinzmetal's angina.

Receptors that mediate TXA2 actions are thromboxane A2 receptors. The human TXA2 receptor (TP) is a typical G protein-coupled receptor (GPCR) with seven transmembrane segments. In humans, two TP receptor splice variants – TPα and TPβ – have so far been cloned.

Synthesis and breakdown
TXA2 is generated from prostaglandin H2 by thromboxane-A synthase in a metabolic reaction which generates approximately equal amounts of 12-Hydroxyheptadecatrienoic acid (12-HHT). Aspirin irreversibly inhibits platelet cyclooxygenase 1 preventing the formation of prostaglandin H2, and therefore thromboxane A2.

TXA2 is very unstable in aqueous solution, since it is hydrated within about 30 seconds to the biologically inactive thromboxane B2. 12-HHT, while once thought to be an inactive byproduct of TXA2 synthesis, has recently been shown to have a range of potentially important actions, some of which relate to the actions of TXA2 (see 12-Hydroxyheptadecatrienoic acid).  Due to its very short half life, TXA2 primarily functions as an autocrine or paracrine mediator in the nearby tissues surrounding its site of production. Most work in the field of TXA2 is done instead with synthetic analogs such as U46619 and I-BOP. In human studies, 11-dehydrothromboxane B2 levels are used to indirectly measure TXA2 production.

References

Eicosanoids